The 2022–23 Brown Bears men's basketball team represented Brown University in the 2022–23 NCAA Division I men's basketball season. The Bears, led by 10th-year head coach Mike Martin, played their home games at the Pizzitola Sports Center in Providence, Rhode Island, as members of the Ivy League. They finished the season with a record of 14–13, 7–7 in Ivy League play, tying for fourth place. They failed to qualify for the Ivy League tournament.

Previous season
The Bears finished the 2021–22 season 13–16, 5–9 in Ivy League play to finish in seventh place. Since only the top four teams qualify for the Ivy League tournament, they failed to qualify.

Description
On February 11, Martin won his 134th game with the Bears, making him the "winningest" coach in the history of the Brown Bears basketball program.

Roster

Schedule and results

|-
!colspan=12 style=| Exhibition

|-
!colspan=12 style=| Non-conference regular season

|-
!colspan=12 style=| Ivy League regular season

Sources

References

Brown Bears men's basketball seasons
Brown Bears
Brown Bears men's basketball
Brown Bears men's basketball